The Imperial New Delhi is a historic luxury hotel opened in 1936 in New Delhi, India. It is located on Janpath, close to Rajiv Chowk. It was New Delhi's first grand hotel.

History

The hotel was designed in a mix of Art Deco, Victorian and colonial styles by architect, F.B. Blomfield, an associate of  Edwin Lutyens, who designed the new capital of the British Raj, New Delhi. The hotel was built by Sandhu Jat Jagirdar S.B.S. Ranjit Singh, son of R.B.S. Narain Singh, honoured by the British Raj, at the Coronation Durbar of 1911, when New Delhi was declared the new Capital of India.

The hotel was officially opened in 1936 by Lord Willingdon, the Viceroy of India. Also present was his wife, Lady Willingdon, who chose the hotel's name and conferred its lion insignia upon it.

The hotel was restored by its General Manager and Vice President, Mr Harvinder Sekhon, between 1996 and 2001. During his tenure, the Imperial hosted the Queen of the Netherlands, Hollywood actors and actresses, adventurers, and tycoons. He also opened the six restaurants and bars which are called "Spice Route", "Patiala Peg Bar", "1911 Restaurant and Bar", "Daniells Tavern" and "San Gimignano". Please also refer to the "New Delhi Hotel Opens Door to Art, Los Angeles Times, December 7, 1997, Associated Press" and "India: Fishlock's empire" by Mr. Trevor Fishlock, Daily Telegraph, London, 27 November 2000.

Today, the hotel has the largest collection of colonial and post-colonial art and artifacts anywhere in Delhi, and has a museum and an art gallery. The Imperial was awarded Travel + Leisure India's Best Award for Heritage Hotel in 2017, awarded Best Heritage Hotel by Outlook Traveller in 2018 and listed in the Conde Nast Gold List of best hotels in 2018 in amongst multiple other awards.

The hotel contains nine restaurants and eateries ranging from fine dining to bars, three function rooms, a spa, salon and nine styles of accommodation.

Heritage 
Hotel Imperial, New Delhi is well known for its heritage and legacy. It has a well known bar called 'Patiala Peg'. It was this hotel and the bar where Pandit Jawaharlal Nehru, Mahatma Gandhi, Mohammad Ali Jinnah and Lord Mountbatten met to discuss the Partition of India and the birth of Pakistan. It is also the name of a school in Aligarh.

See also
List of hotels in Delhi

Further reading

References

 
(http://www.hotelsofnewdelhi.com/five-star-deluxe-hotels-in-new-delhi/imperial-hotel-new-delhi.html)

External links 

 The Imperial Delhi
 The Imperial Hotels in New Delhi

New Delhi
Hotel buildings completed in 1936
Art Deco architecture in India
Hotels established in 1936
Hotels in Delhi
Heritage hotels in India

ru:Империал (жилой комплекс)